Robert Wolf (born 13 June 1971) is a Czech swimmer. He competed in two events at the 1988 Summer Olympics.

References

External links
 

1971 births
Living people
Czech male swimmers
Olympic swimmers of Czechoslovakia
Swimmers at the 1988 Summer Olympics
Sportspeople from Brno